Joseph or Joe Carroll may refer to:

 Joe Carroll (American football) (born 1950), American football player
 Joseph Carroll (footballer), English footballer for Bradford City
 Joseph Carroll (DIA) (1910–1991), first director of the Defense Intelligence Agency
 Joseph Carroll (scholar) (born 1949), evolutionary literary theorist
 Joseph Carroll (bishop) (1912–1992), Irish priest, educator and auxiliary bishop of Dublin
 Joe Carroll (priest) (1941–2021), American priest
 Joe Carroll (singer) (1919–1981), jazz vocalist
 Joe Carroll (cricketer) (born 1991), Australian cricketer
 Joe Barry Carroll (born 1958), American basketball player
 Joe Carroll, a character from The Following